Bernardino del Signoraccio or Signoracci (active first three decades of 16th century) was an Italian painter of the Renaissance period, active in Tuscany.

Biography
He was the father of the painter Fra Paolino da Pistoia. Bernardino painted in the manner of Ghirlandaio. Bernardino was the initial trainer of his son.

References

Year of birth unknown
Year of death unknown
16th-century Italian painters
Italian male painters
Italian Renaissance painters
Painters from Tuscany